Carl H. Esbeck is the R.B. Price Distinguished Professor and the Isabelle Wade & Paul C. Lyda Professor of Law at the University of Missouri School of Law.  He joined the law faculty in 1981.  He has published in the areas of church-state relations and civil rights.  He has taken the lead in advancing a structural view of the establishment clause of the first amendment, and is also credited as the primary author of the original charitable choice language in the 1996 welfare reform bill.

Scholarship 
Professor Esbeck regularly researches and publishes in the areas of religious liberties and civil rights.

Representative publications 

Protestant Dissent and the Virginia Disestablishment, 1776—1786, 7 Georgetown Journal of Law & Public Policy 51 (2009).

The 60th Anniversary of the Everson Decision and America's Church-State Proposition, 23 Journal of Law and Religion 15 (2007–08).

Governance and the Religion Question: Voluntaryism, Disestablishment, and America's Church-State Proposition, 48 Journal of Church & State 202 (Spring 2006)

The Freedom of Faith-Based Organizations to Staff On a Religious Basis, CENTER FOR PUBLIC JUSTICE (Sept, 2004), with Stanley W. Carlson-Thies & Ronald J. Sider.

Dissent and Disestablishment: The Church-State Settlement in the Early American Republic, 2004 BYU Law Review 1385 (2004).

Religious Organizations in the United States, A Study of Identity, Liberty, and the Law, (Carolina Academic Press, 2004). contributed 2 chapters to this book - Regulation of Religious Organizations via Governmental Financial Assistance and Charitable Choice and the Critics.

The Establishment Clause as a Structural Restraint: Validations and Ramifications, 18 JOURNAL OF LAW & POLITICS 445 (2002).

Statement Before the United States House of Representatives Concerning Charitable Choice and the Community Solutions Act, 16 NOTRE DAME JOURNAL OF LAW, ETHICS & PUB. POL'Y 567 (2002).

Differentiating the Free Exercise and Establishment Clauses, 42 Journal of Church and State 311 (2000).

Myths, Miscues and Misconceptions: No-Aid Separationism and the Establishment Clause, 13 NOTRE DAME JOURNAL OF LAW, ETHICS & PUBLIC POLICY 285 (1999).

On Rights and Restraints, 94 LIBERTY 22-29 (March/April 1999).

The Neutral Treatment of Religion and Faith-Based Social Service Providers: Charitable Choice and Its Critics, in WELFARE REFORM AND FAITH-BASED ORGANIZATIONS 173 (Derek Davis & Barry Hankins editors, 1999).

The Establishment Clause as a Structural Restraint on Governmental Power, 84 IOWA L. REV. 1-113 (1998)

References

External links
 Faculty Bio
 

American legal scholars
University of Missouri faculty
Living people
University of Missouri School of Law faculty
Year of birth missing (living people)
1950s births